Bower may refer to:

Arts and entertainment
 Catherine, or The Bower, an unfinished Jane Austen novel
 A high-ranking card (usually a Jack) in certain card games:
 The Right and Left Bower (or Bauer), the two highest-ranking cards in the game of Euchre
 The Best and Under Bower in the game of Bester Bauer
 The Right and Left Bower in the game of Réunion
Bower Studios, a design studio based in NYC.

Places
 Bower, South Australia, a town
 Bower, Highland, Scotland, a village and civil parish
 Bower, Nebraska, a ghost town in the United States
 Bower, West Virginia, a ghost town in the United States
 Havering-atte-Bower, a village within the London Borough of Havering
 Mount Bower, Victoria Land, Antarctica

People
 Bower (surname)
 Bower Featherstone, Canadian civil servant convicted of espionage in 1966
 E. Bower Carty (1916–2001), Canadian public servant and Chairman of the World Scout Committee
 Roger Squires (born 1932), British retired crossword compiler/setter, one of whose pseudonyms was Bower

Other uses
 The Bower, a building in Jefferson County, West Virginia, on the National Register of Historic Places
 Bower Award
 1639 Bower, an asteroid
 Bower railway station, Highland, Scotland
 A sculpture built by a bowerbird to attract a mate
 A dwelling or lean-to shelter, also known as a pergola
 An anchor carried at the bow of a ship
 A woman's bedroom or private apartments, especially in a medieval castle – cf. boudoir

See also
 Pandorea jasminoides, a vine species also known as the bower of beauty, bower vine or bower plant
 Bower House, a grade I listed Palladian mansion in Havering-atte-Bower, England
 Bower Fold, Stalybridge, Greater Manchester, England, the home ground of Stalybridge Celtic football club
 Bower Place, a shopping centre in Red Deer, Alberta, Canada
 Bower Manuscript, a Sanskrit manuscript
 Bauer (disambiguation)
 Bowers (disambiguation)
 Bowery (disambiguation)